Oscar Movies Bhojpuri is an Indian cable and satellite television channel, owned by OSM Network. The channel was launched on 1 May 2013, as a 24-hour Bhojpuri movie channel.

Current shows 
Maai Ke Darbar
Bhakti Bhav
Sadabahar Songs
Aap Ka Pasand
Om Namah Shivay
Shree Ganesh
Senhoor
Mr. Jugadu Laal
Dharam Katha
Sa-Se Sarssatti
Naach Nachaiya Dhoom Nachaiya
Surya Puran

Former shows 
Shree Ganesh
Jap Tap Vrat
Surya Puran
Hamar Sautan Hamar Saheli
Bhaag Na Baache Koi
Dulhin Uhe Jo Nanad Mann Bhaye

Awards 
Bhojpuri Film Awards
Sabrang Film Awards
Bhojpuri Cine Awards
Green Cinema Awards

See also
List of Bhojpuri-language television channels

References

Hindi-language television channels in India
Television channels and stations established in 2013
Television stations in New Delhi
Hindi-language television stations
2012 establishments in Delhi
Companies based in Noida
Movie channels in India